Servilio is a given name. Notable people with the name include:

 Servílio de Jesús (1914-1984), Brazilian football midfielder
 Servílio Conti (1916-2014), Italian prelate
 Servilio Torres (born 1938), Cuban sports shooter
 Servílio (footballer, 1939-2005), full name Servílio de Jesus Filho, Brazilian football striker
 Servílio de Oliveira (born 1948), Brazilian boxer

See also
Servilia (disambiguation)